The Kander Neve is a  long glacier (2005) of the Bernese Alps, situated south of Kandersteg in the canton of Berne. The glacier lies at the upper end of the Gasterental, at the foot of the Blüemlisalp and the Tschingelhorn. It borders the valley of Lauterbrunnen on the east (Tschingel Pass) and the canton of Valais on the south (Petersgrat).

The glacier feeds the head waters of the Kander, a river that flows into Lake Thun, and hence into the Aare and the Rhine.

See also
List of glaciers in Switzerland
Swiss Alps

External links
Swiss glacier monitoring network
Interactive repeat photo comparisons of Kander Glacier

Glaciers of Switzerland
Glaciers of the Alps
GKander